Galleh Dar Rural District is a rural district (dehestan) in Galleh Dar District, Mohr County, Fars Province, Iran. At the 2006 census, its population was 343, in 66 families.  The rural district has 1 village.

References 

Rural Districts of Fars Province
Mohr County